Assassination Classroom is an anime series adapted from Yūsei Matsui's manga series of the same name, which is serialized in Shueisha's Weekly Shounen Jump magazine. The series follows Kunugigaoka Junior High School's Class 3-E as they attempt to assassinate their homeroom teacher, an octopus-like creature named Koro-sensei, before graduation, while also learning some valuable lessons from him. Produced by Lerche and directed by Seiji Kishi, the first season was broadcast in Japan on Fuji TV from January 9 to June 19, 2015. The series is licensed in North America by Funimation, who simulcast the subtitled version as it aired and streamed an English dub version from February 18, 2015.

A second season aired between January 7, 2016 and June 30, 2016 and was once again simulcast by Funimation, who began releasing the broadcast dub version from February 10, 2016.

A compilation film of the series and an anime film based on the spin-off manga series, released in Japan on November 19, 2016.

Prior to the television series, an original video animation produced by Brain's Base was screened at Jump Super Anime Tour in October 2013 and was bundled with the seventh manga volume on December 27, 2013. A second OVA episode, produced by the TV series staff, screened at Jump Special Anime Fest in November 2014 and was included with the series' first BD/DVD volume on March 27, 2015.

Adult Swim's Toonami programming block began broadcasting Funimation's English dub of the anime starting on August 30, 2020, and began airing season 2 on January 9, 2022.

Series overview

Episode list

Season 1 (2015)

Season 2 (2016)

OVAs

Notes

References

Assassination Classroom
Assassination Classroom